Austria–Nepal relations refers to bilateral foreign relations between Austria and Nepal.

Austria–Nepal relations were officially established on 15 August 1959. Nepal has an embassy in Vienna and Austria has an embassy in Kathmandu.

See also 
 Foreign relations of Austria 
 Foreign relations of Nepal
 Nepalis in Austria

References 

 
Bilateral relations of Nepal
Nepal